Elections to Banbridge District Council were held on 17 May 1989 on the same day as the other Northern Irish local government elections. The election used three district electoral areas to elect a total of 15 councillors.

Election results

Note: "Votes" are the first preference votes.

Districts summary

|- class="unsortable" align="centre"
!rowspan=2 align="left"|Ward
! % 
!Cllrs
! % 
!Cllrs
! %
!Cllrs
! %
!Cllrs
!rowspan=2|TotalCllrs
|- class="unsortable" align="center"
!colspan=2 bgcolor="" | UUP
!colspan=2 bgcolor="" | SDLP
!colspan=2 bgcolor="" | DUP
!colspan=2 bgcolor="white"| Others
|-
|align="left"|Banbridge Town
|bgcolor="40BFF5"|63.7
|bgcolor="40BFF5"|3
|19.6
|1
|9.8
|1
|6.9
|0
|5
|-
|align="left"|Dromore
|bgcolor="40BFF5"|61.7
|bgcolor="40BFF5"|4
|18.3
|1
|14.5
|0
|5.5
|0
|5
|-
|align="left"|Knockiveagh
|bgcolor="40BFF5"|48.5
|bgcolor="40BFF5"|2
|19.9
|1
|16.2
|1
|15.4
|1
|5
|- class="unsortable" class="sortbottom" style="background:#C9C9C9"
|align="left"| Total
|58.0
|9
|19.2
|3
|13.5
|2
|9.3
|1
|15
|-
|}

Districts results

Banbridge Town

1985: 3 x UUP, 1 x SDLP, 1 x DUP
1989: 3 x UUP, 1 x SDLP, 1 x DUP
1985-1989 Change: No change

Dromore

1985: 3 x UUP, 1 x DUP, 1 x SDLP
1989: 4 x UUP, 1 x SDLP
1985-1989 Change: UUP gain from DUP

Knockiveagh

1985: 2 x UUP, 1 x DUP, 1 x SDLP, 1 x Independent Nationalist
1989: 2 x UUP, 1 x DUP, 1 x SDLP, 1 x Independent Nationalist
1985-1989 Change: No change

References

Banbridge District Council elections
Banbridge